"Dogs Are Everywhere" is a non-album single released by British band Pulp in 1986. The title song is a soft ballad reminiscent of the band's first album It, but the B-sides have a darker sound closer to what would become the band's next album, Freaks. All of the songs are included on the compilation album Masters of the Universe.

Track listing
All songs written and composed by Jarvis Cocker, Candida Doyle, Peter Mansell and Russell Senior.

Side A
"Dogs Are Everywhere" – 4:53
"The Mark of the Devil" – 4:35

Side B
"97 Lovers" – 4:30
"Aborigine" – 4:53
"Goodnight" – 5:08

Personnel
Jarvis Cocker – Guitar, Vocals
Candida Doyle – Keyboards
Magnus Doyle – Drums
Peter Mansell – Bass
Russell Senior – Guitar, Violin, bowed bass guitar

References

1986 singles
Pulp (band) songs
Songs written by Jarvis Cocker
Songs written by Candida Doyle
Songs written by Russell Senior
Fire Records (UK) singles